Made in China is the mark affixed to products manufactured in the People's Republic of China.

Made in China may also refer to:
Made in China 2025, Chinese government plan by the State Council

Films 
 Made in China (2009 film), an American comedy film
 Made in China (2014 film), a South Korean film directed by Dong-hoo Kim
 Made in China (2019 film), a Bollywood film directed by Mikhil Musale
 Made in China (2019 French film), a French film directed by Julien Abraham
 Ittymaani: Made in China, an Indian Malayalam-language film
 Chandni Chowk to China, a 2009 Indian film originally titled Made in China

Music
 Made in China (album), a 2005 album by Juliana Hatfield
 "Made in China", alias of American record producer Dr. Luke

See also
Made in Taiwan, the mark affixed to products manufactured in the island of Taiwan controlled by the Republic of China